Croft Pasture is a  biological Site of Special Scientific Interest on the outskirts of Croft in Leicestershire. Most of the site, totalling 5.8 hectares, is owned and managed by the Leicestershire and Rutland Wildlife Trust.

The River Soar runs through this unimproved grazed meadow, which is dominated by common bent and crested dog's-tail. A knoll in the north of the site has uncommon flora such as meadow saxifrage, common stork's-bill and subterranean clover.

There is access from Station Road.

References

Leicestershire and Rutland Wildlife Trust
Sites of Special Scientific Interest in Leicestershire